Soheil Shameli (born 28 September 1994) is an Iranian male squash player. He achieved his highest career ranking of 221 in March 2018 which is also his current ranking which he achieved during the 2018 PSA World Tour.

References 

1994 births
Living people
Iranian male squash players
Sportspeople from Tehran